is a Japanese actor and singer represented by Space Craft Entertainment. Ide was the keyboardist and rapper of Cocoa Otoko. He was also a former member of the boy band Ryoga. He was a "TV Senshi" in the NHK Educational TV series Tensai TV-kun Series from 2001 to 2004.

Biography
On 1993 Ide debuted as a model in Harajuku.

From April 2001 to March 2005 he appeared in 'Tensai TV-kun Series'' as a "TV Senshi".

On 2010 Ide became a member of Cocoa Otoko. The group later disbanded on March 2012. He later became a solo singer in 2013. Ide graduated from Aoyama Gakuin University in March 2015. On April 2016 he later became a member of the dance vocal group Ryoga. He left Ryoga on December 31st, 2017.

Filmography

Drama

Anime

Films

Stage

One-man shows

Variety

Other TV series

Bibliography

Magazines

Books

References

External links
 

1991 births
Living people
Male actors from Tokyo
21st-century Japanese singers
21st-century Japanese male singers